Konjadkar or Konjed Kar may refer to:
 Konjadkar, Bagh-e Malek
 Konjed Kar, Masjed Soleyman